The 1984 All-Ireland Senior Camogie Championship Final was the 51st All-Ireland Final and the deciding match of the 1984 All-Ireland Senior Camogie Championship, an inter-county camogie tournament for the top teams in Ireland.

Dublin had the wind for the first half and scored two lucky goals, leading 3-5 to 0-2 at the break and never looking like losing their lead.

References

All-Ireland Senior Camogie Championship Final
All-Ireland Senior Camogie Championship Final
All-Ireland Senior Camogie Championship Final, 1984
All-Ireland Senior Camogie Championship Finals
Dublin county camogie team matches
Tipperary county camogie team matches